Yoo on the Park is a 25-story apartment building in Atlanta, Georgia, United States. Completed in 2017, the building is located in midtown Atlanta, near Piedmont Park.

History 
The project was mentioned in a 2015 interview by Multi-Housing News with the CEO of The Trillist Companies, wherein he claimed that the project was part of a partnership between his company and YOO Studio. As part of the interview, he claimed that the project would see the construction of a 25-story apartment building adjacent to Piedmont Park. According to the official website for Midtown Atlanta, the building is "Atlanta's first internationally designed and branded luxury residential apartment community." As part of the construction, the developers purchased  of development rights (a process known as transferable development rights) from the Margaret Mitchell House and Museum. In 2016, it was announced that the bottom floor retail space would house a cryotherapy facility. The apartment officially opened in March 2017. In September, a one-year lease to an apartment in the building was auctioned off as part of a fundraising event for the Piedmont Park Conservancy.

References 

2017 establishments in Georgia (U.S. state)
Apartment buildings in Atlanta
Midtown Atlanta
Residential buildings completed in 2017